The Adelaide Liedertafel (Die Adelaider Liedertafel) is a traditional German male choir, one of several Liedertafeln, or song societies, in the history of Adelaide and South Australia. It is Australia's oldest male choir.

History
The first "Adelaide Liedertafel" met in 1854 and 1855 at Wiener & Fischer's coffee house on Rundle Street, but disbanded when Robert Wiener and George Fischer left for Tanunda, where they operated the Tanunda Hotel.
This was not the first Liedertafel in the city however, as the Deutsche Liedertafel, with which Carl Linger (composer, "Song of Australia") was closely identified if not the leader, was performing as early as January 1850, pre-dating the founding of the German Club in 1854, both associated with the Hamburg Hotel.

The better-known, and current, Adelaide Liedertafel was founded in Adelaide in December 1858 by members of the Deutscher Club of Adelaide, notably Linger and Carl Mumme. They comprised much of the younger membership of the Club, who felt stultified by the reactionary attitudes of the older members. They broke away completely from the Club, which was by then meeting at the Hotel Europe, and made their headquarters back at "Father" Kopke's Hamburg Hotel.

The first office-holders were Johann Friedrich Martin "Friedrich" "Fritz" Armbrüster (June 1826 – 10 February 1897) president; Adolph Schlüter (c. 1835 – 30 March 1873) secretary and librarian; and Carl Linger (leader / conductor). Tenors were Julius H. C. Eitzen (1830–1897), Wilhelm Nitschke (1816–1889), Johann Gottlieb Christoph / Christov Reinhardt (c. 1824 – 6 August 1900), and Schlüter; second tenors:  Ludwig "Louis" Maraun (c. 1820 – 3 November 1898), Hermann Heinrich Samuel Nettelbeck (1839-1918), and Frederick Wurm; basses: Oscar Ziegler ( –1916), Braun, C. G. Schedlich, and Charles Bielefeld; second basses: F. Armbrüster, J. W. Schierenbeck, and G. V. Eimer.

They performed at the Linger's funeral ceremony, as did the Brunswick (Brass) Band, of which he was also a founder.

A notable concert was held at White's Rooms by the Liedertafel and Brunswick Band in August 1864 in aid of the Schleswig-Holstein Relief Fund. The Schleswig War of 1864 was a suppression of German nationals in the Danish province.
Other charitable concerts were for the Indian Famine Fund and the Patriotic War Fund ft the time of the Boer war.
They performed for dignitaries such as the Duke of York (later George V).
They appeared with musical entities Antoinette Link, Amy Sherwin, Ilma de Murska, Heinrich Koehler, and Antonia Dolores.

In 1867, following the death of Spietzschka, Carl Püttmann was appointed conductor, a post he held for 20 years. The first performance given by the choir under his baton was a comic opera Die Mordgrundbruck bei Dresden at the Theatre Royal in 1868; the first opera performed by amateurs in Adelaide.

The club was reorganised in 1871.

The choir attended the 1874 Sängerfest in Tanunda, along with the Adelaide Turnverein and Adelaide Liederkranz, hosted by the Tanunda Liedertafel and Tanunda Riflemen.

Quarterly social gatherings were held at the Hotel Europe 1877, "Smoke socials" organised by Armbrüster. In that year "passive" (non-singing) members were first admitted, to the financial benefit of the Club.

The club rented a large room in the Freemasons' Hall, adjacent Earl of Zetland Hotel, Flinders Street from ?? to 1880, the German Club's Albert Hall, then from 1882 the King of Hanover Hotel.

At the 22nd anniversary of its foundation in 1880 at the Albert Hall, the Liedertafel performed exclusively compositions by their patron Franz Abt, under the Püttmann baton, Otto Stange on piano.

In March 1891 the German Singing Society (organiser H. Heinicke) amalgamated with the Liedertafel, as did several other minor German societies.

A "Grand Anniversary Concert" was held at the Adelaide Town Hall in September 1905.

At their 50th anniversary in September 1908, a great concert was held at the Jubilee Exhibition Building on North Terrace by the choirs of South Australia and Broken Hill, Ada Crossley, the Governor and Lady Le Hunte attending. Participating alongside the Liedertafel were the Adelaide Choral Society, Bach Society, Orpheus Society, Glee Club, Port Adelaide Orpheus Society, and the Broken Hill Quartet Club.

The club disbanded in 1914, and re-formed after the Great War, but for the members' pleasure only; they held no further concerts. It was re-formed again after World War II by Hermann Homburg, and survives to this day, though with reduced and ageing membership.

Office holders
Presidents
This list is incomplete
1858 (Johann) Wilhelm Schierenbeck (died in Germany 1887)
1873–1889 (at least) Friedrich Armbrüster
1874 H. Nettelbeck (perhaps Herman Heinrich Samuel Nettelbeck (1839 – 28 May 1918)
1891–1904 Frederick Basse (c. 1851 – 17 April 1913)
1908–1911 H. Rudolph "Rudi" Büring, sen. (25 August 1844 – 16 August 1923)

Conductors
1858–1864 Carl Linger
1864–1865 Carl Julius Kunze (c. 1825–1868)
1865–1867 Wilhelm Spietschka (c. 1840 – 22 January 1867) died after riding accident; mentioned in Loyau's Notable South Australians.
1867–1886 Carl Püttmann
1886–1891 Carl, or Charles, Edmund Mumme (1839–1919) deputised for Püttmann on occasion from 1879; was also conductor of the Catholic Cathedral Choir.
1889–1890 W. R. Pybus had difficulty in the position due to his lack of German.
1891–1914 Hermann Heinicke (1863–1949). He founded Adelaide Grand Orchestra in 1893.
1914 and post-war F. Ochernal

Secretaries
Frederick Hermann Otto (c. 1848 - 4 October 1894)
1908 F. Ochernal

Notes

References

External links
Adelaider Liedertafel 1858 Inc. - front page
Adelaider Liedertafel 1858- a Detailed History

Australian choirs
Culture of South Australia
Musical groups established in 1858
1858 establishments in Australia
German-Australian culture